Stone Mountain Arts Center (SMAC), located in Brownfield, Maine, is an intimate performance hall situated in the foothills of the White Mountains. Despite its small size and remote location, artists who have performed there include Richie Havens, The Indigo Girls, Bela Fleck and the Flecktones, Martin Sexton, Marty Stuart, and Tom Rush, among others.

Folk singer/songwriter Carol Noonan owns and operates the center, along with her husband Jeff Flagg.

Notability References
Boston Sunday Globe, Arts & Entertainment - May 10, 2009
Boston(WCVB)Chronicle - March 2009
DownEast Magazine - April 2009
Portland Magazine - April 2009
Yankee Magazine, Editor's Choice Award 2009

References

External links
Official Stone Mountain Arts Center Website

Music venues in Maine
Performing arts centers in Maine
Buildings and structures in Oxford County, Maine
Tourist attractions in Oxford County, Maine